Monkee Business is a compilation album of songs by the Monkees, issued by Rhino Records in 1982. It was the first American Monkees rarities collection and was released on both LP and cassette formats, with the LP being a picture disc. 

Monkee Business marked the U.S. LP debut of several non-album tracks which had only been released as singles or B-sides: "Goin' Down," "D.W. Washburn", "It's Nice to Be with You," "Someday Man" and "Tema Dei Monkees," the Italian version of "(Theme From) The Monkees." Additionally, "Steam Engine" and "Love to Love" had been previously unreleased until the 1979 Australian compilation album Monkeemania (40 Timeless Hits). As a picture disc, the playback quality of Monkee Business was inferior to standard vinyl of the early 1980s.

The album was reissued in 1986 with a recompiled track listing from different sources, which resulted in several mixing variations. This second pressing is notable for including studio chatter at the beginning of "Someday Man" that had not been heard on the 1982 edition. The 1986 edition can be identified by "RE-1" appearing in the LP's inner groove.

Monkee Business went out of print as Rhino shifted from vinyl releases to compact discs. Each of the tracks have since been reissued, digitally remastered, on various individual Monkees CDs, as part of the Missing Links collections or as bonus tracks on concurrent Monkees albums.

The photo of the band used on the cover is a reversed image from the original.

Track listing

Original 1982 LP
Side 1

Side 2

1986 reissue LP

Side 1

Side 2

References

External links
 

The Monkees compilation albums
1982 compilation albums
Rhino Records compilation albums